is a former Japanese football player.

Playing career
Tazawa was born in Shizuoka Prefecture on July 16, 1979. After graduating from Dohto University, he joined J1 League club Consadole Sapporo in 2002. On November 23, he debuted as substitute forward against Vegalta Sendai. However he could only play this match in 2002. In 2003, he moved to Japan Football League club Jatco. He played many matches and scored 9 goals. From 2004, he played FC Eastern (2004), TDK (2005), FC Gifu (2006) and Thank FC Kuriyama (2007). He retired end of 2007 season.

Club statistics

References

External links

1979 births
Living people
Seisa Dohto University alumni
Association football people from Shizuoka Prefecture
Japanese footballers
J1 League players
Japan Football League players
Hokkaido Consadole Sapporo players
Jatco SC players
Blaublitz Akita players
FC Gifu players
Association football forwards